The 83rd Wallajahbad Light Infantry was an infantry regiment originally raised in 1794 as the 33rd Madras Battalion, part of the Presidency of Madras Army which was itself part of the Honourable East India Company Army.  The presidency armies, like the presidencies themselves, belonged to the East India Company until the Government of India Act 1858 (passed in the aftermath of the Indian Rebellion of 1857) transferred all three presidencies to the direct authority of the British Crown.  In 1903 all three presidency armies were merged into the British Indian Army. The unit was disbanded before Indian Independence.

History

They took part in the Battle of Seringapatam during the Fourth Anglo-Mysore War and the Second Burmese War.

First World War
The regiment was stationed at Secunderabad in 1914 on the outbreak of war and was here until at least early 1916.

They sent a wing of the regiment as a draft to the 63rd Palamcottah L. I. in 1914, which saw action in East Africa until December 1916, when it rejoined the regiment at Mandalay.

Meanwhile, the other wing was sent to serve in the Persian Gulf from 21 September 1916, being split up in detachments between Jask, Chabahar, Bandar Abbas, Henjam, Kishm Island, Lingeh and Bahrain, all port towns on the Gulf of Oman relieving the 94th Infantry detachments previously stationed there until they were relieved by the 3rd Brahmins from 16 July 1917.

They were joined by the other wing of the regiment and were sent to serve in Mesopotamia, where they were successively stationed at Basra, Tanoomah, and Nar Oomah from 24 July 1917 to 3 May 1919.

1919-1922
From here they were sent join the forces in North Persia from 4 May 1919 at Hamadan and Kasvin in 1919, where misfortune in the shape of an epidemic of influenza overtook it, the casualties during the period, 15 December 1919, to 30 March, being no less than 57.

In Iraq from May 1920 doing garrison duty in Kut & Amarah until it returned to India in June 1921

The regiment arrived at Cannanore 24 June 1921.

They arrived back from foreign service into another inflamed situation at home - the Moplah rebellion.

During the operations that followed, from their base at Cannanore the 83rd carried out for the protection duties in the northern portion of Malabar, where outbreaks occasionally threatened. This situation lasted until February 1922.

On 5 December 1921, Moplah prisoners in Cannamore gaol rioted. A breakout was attempted and in the ensuing struggle with the warders six internees were killed. Eventually troops from the 83rd had to be called out to restore order

After World War I the Indian government reformed the army, moving from single battalion regiments to multi battalion regiments. The 83rd Wallajahbad Light Infantry now became the 4th Battalion, 3rd Madras Regiment (Wallajahbad Light Infantry)   in 1922 however they were disbanded in 1923.

Previous names
33rd Battalion of Madras Native Infantry - 1794
1st Battalion, 12th Regiment of Madras Native Infantry - 1797
12th Regiment of Madras Native Infantry, or Wallajahbad Light Infantry - 1812
23rd Madras Native Infantry, or Wallajahbad Light Infantry - 1824
23rd (Wallajahbad) Regiment of Madras (Light) Infantry - 1885
23rd (Wallajahbad) Madras Light Infantry - 1901
83rd Wallajahbad Light Infantry - 1903

References

Sources

 Jackson, Maj. Donovan. India's Army. Sampson Low. London 1940.

Quarterly Indian Army List January 1919, Army Headquarters India, Calcutta 1919.

Honourable East India Company regiments
British Indian Army infantry regiments
Military history of the Madras Presidency
Military units and formations established in 1794
Military units and formations disestablished in 1922
1794 establishments in British India